Naadodigal Gopal was an Indian character actor  who worked over 30 films  Tamil cinema.

Personal life and education 
KKP Gopalakrishnan is married to Kavitha and has 2 daughters (twins) Surabhi and Sherya .He done his schooling  in   Diamond Jubilee Higher Secondary School Gobichettipalayam, Erode. He studied in PSG College of Arts and Science in Coimbatore

Career 
Originally a farmer and businessman  made his debut Naadodigal (2009) directed by his friend   Samuthirakani and the success of the film meant that he appended the film to his stage name as Nadodigal Gopal . He played in   Poraali (2011) followed by  Vettai (2012). In 2013   Kedi Billa Killadi Ranga and  Varuthapadatha Valibar Sangam. Nimirndhu Nil (2014) and In 2015  Sakalakala Vallavan and   Rajinimurugan , Raja Manthiri , Kidaari  (2016).  Seemaraja (2018)   Namma Veetu Pillai (2019) garnered acclaim. He has often acted in several films with directors  Samuthirakani ,  Ponram and   Pandiraj .His last film was Annaatthe  directed by Siva  starring Rajinikanth  released on 4 November after his death .

Death 
Gopal died from a heart attack on 5 February 2020. He was 54 years old at the time of his death.

Filmography 
 Films

 Short films 
Wake Up Call (2016)

References

External links 
 

Indian male film actors
Tamil male actors
Male actors from Tamil Nadu
21st-century Indian male actors
2020 deaths
Male actors in Tamil cinema
1966 births